Bailin Township is a township in Bama Yao Autonomous County, Guangxi, China.

Administrative division
As of 2016, the township is divided into five villages: 
 Yangchun
 Nanong
 Namo
 Luopi
 Pingtian

Geography
The township is situated at southeastern Bama Yao Autonomous County. It borders Dahua Yao Autonomous County in the east, Pingguo in the south, and Tiandong County in the west.

The Lingqi River winds through the township.

Economy
The township's economy is based on nearby mineral resources and agricultural resources. Significant crops include grain, corn, soybean, Castanea mollissima, peanut, fruit, and sugarcane. Recently, silkworm breeding has significantly developed in the township. The region also has an abundance of gold, titanium, manganese and silicon.

Transportation
The Provincial Highway S208 passes across the township.

References

Bibliography
 

Townships of Hechi
Divisions of Bama Yao Autonomous County